The Chromic acid cell was a type of primary cell which used chromic acid as a depolarizer.  The chromic acid was usually made by acidifying (with sulfuric acid) a solution of potassium dichromate.  The old name for potassium dichromate was potassium bichromate and the cell was often called a Bichromate cell.  This type of cell is now only of historical interest.

History

Construction

The main elements of the cell were:

 Anode, zinc
 Electrolyte, dilute sulfuric acid
 Depolarizer, chromic acid
 Cathode, carbon

The cell was made in two forms - the single-fluid type, attributed to Poggendorff and the two-fluid type, attributed to Fuller.  In both cases, cell voltage was about 2 volts.

Poggendorff cell

The cell was set up in a long-necked glass bottle with a zinc plate located between two carbon plates.  The electrolyte and depolarizer were mixed.  The mixture would dissolve the zinc plate even when the cell was not in use, so there was a mechanism for lifting the zinc plate out of the liquid and storing it in the neck of the bottle.

Fuller cell

The cell was set up in a glass, or glazed earthenware, pot.  This contained the chromic acid solution, the carbon plate and a porous pot.  Inside the porous pot was dilute sulfuric acid, the zinc rod, and a small quantity of mercury.  The mercury formed an amalgam with the zinc and this reduced "local action", i.e. unwanted dissolution of the zinc when the cell was not in use.

See also 
 List of battery types

References

External links
 Website: Telegraph batteries

Battery types